Cookstown Junction railway station served the townland of Drumsough outside Randalstown in County Antrim, Northern Ireland. It was a single island platform at the junction of the Cookstown extension to Magherafelt, Cookstown, Draperstown and Macfin.

History

The station was opened as Drumsough Junction by the Belfast and Ballymena Railway on 11 April 1848.

It was renamed Cookstown Junction on 1 October 1858.

The station closed to passengers on 28 August 1950.

References 

Disused railway stations in County Antrim
Railway stations opened in 1848
Railway stations closed in 1976
1976 disestablishments in Northern Ireland
1848 establishments in Ireland
Railway stations in Northern Ireland opened in 1848